The Hatice Sultan Mansion, a historical yalı located at Bosporus in Ortaköy neighborhood of Istanbul, Turkey and named after its original owner Hatice Sultan, is used today as a water sports club's building.

The residence at Defterdarburnu (Defterdar Point) in Ortaköy was used as an orphanage and later as a primary school after the Ottoman dynasty was exiled following the foundation of the Turkish Republic.

See also 
 Ottoman architecture

References 

Ottoman palaces in Istanbul
Bosphorus